Stoke Park School is a coeducational secondary school and sixth form located in Coventry, West Midlands, England.

It was established in 1919 as a grammar school, but later became comprehensive. Previously a foundation school and Technology College administered by Coventry City Council, in October 2017 Stoke Park School converted to academy status. The school is now sponsored by The Futures Trust.

Stoke Park School offers GCSEs and BTECs as programmes of study for pupils, while students in the sixth form have the option to study from a range of A Levels, Cambridge Technicals and further BTECs.

Notable former pupils
Cal Crutchlow, motorcyclist
Marcus Hall, former footballer
Guz Khan, comedian
Christine Oddy, politician
Pa Salieu, rapper

References

External links
Stoke Park School official website

Secondary schools in Coventry
Academies in Coventry
Educational institutions established in 1919
1919 establishments in England
People educated at Stoke Park School and Community College